Fele Martínez (born Rafael Martínez; 22 February 1975) is a Goya Award-winning Spanish actor.

Early years
Martínez was born in Alicante, Spain. A product of the Escuela Superior de Arte Dramático in Madrid, he began to act and direct theater at an early age. His first acting attempts were with the Sexpeare Teatro theater company.

Career
His chance at stardom came at the hand of Alejandro Amenábar, who offered him a role in his opera prima Tesis. It was for this work that Fele received the Goya Award for Best New Actor in 1996. Among his films are the notable Abre Los Ojos (Amenábar, 1997), Los amantes del círculo polar (Julio Médem, 1998), El arte de morir (Álvaro Fernández Armero, 1999), Capitanes de Abril (María de Medeiros, 1999), Tuno negro (Pedro L. Barbero y Vicente J. Martín, 2000), and La Mala Educación (Pedro Almodóvar, 2004).

He has also participated in several independent film projects including the short films Pasaia (1996), for which he won Best Actor at the Elche Film Festival, Amigos (1997), La cartera (2000), and El castigo del ángel (2002) which he also directed.

Filmography 
 Pasaia (1996)
 Tesis (1996)
 Amigos (1997)
 Abre los ojos (1997)
 Los Amantes del Círculo Polar (1998)
 Lágrimas negras (1998)
 Tú que harías por amor (1999)
 El arte de morir (1999)
 Capitanes de Abril (2000)
 Tuno negro (2000)
 Tinta roja (2000)
 La cartera (2000)
 Noche de reyes (2001)
 El castigo del ángel (2002)
 Darkness (2002)
 Hable con ella (2002)
 Dos tipos duros (2003)
 La mala educación (2004)
 Tánger (2004)
 El asesino del parking (2006)
 El síndrome de Svensson (2006)
 A un metro de ti (2007)
 14, Fabian Road (2008)
 Carmo (2008)
 El kaserón (2008)
 Los kinutos del silencio (2009)
 La Estrella (2013)
 The Night My Mother Killed My Father (2016)
 Nuestros Amantes (2017)
 Erase una vez en el caribe (2022)
 Bajo terapia (2022)
 En Temporada Baja (2022)
 Alpha Males (2022)

Theatre 
 Sueños de un Seductor (2004)
 Bajo terapia (2017)

References

External links 
 

This page draws heavily on the corresponding article in the Spanish-language Wikipedia which was accessed in the version of 30 November 2005.

1975 births
Living people
Spanish male film actors
Spanish male stage actors
People from Alicante
20th-century Spanish male actors
21st-century Spanish male actors